Hardaway High School is located in Columbus, Georgia, United States, in the Muscogee County School District. It is one of 221 schools in the state to offer the International Baccalaureate Diploma Programme and International Baccalaureate Career-related Certificate.

Academics
Celebrating its 50th anniversary in 2017, Hardaway's current enrollment is approximately 1,072 in 2019. The school has a particularly high graduation rate, at 90.3% as of 2016.

The school has enjoyed 13 consecutive years of qualifying for the state academic decathlon, and school teams often rank within the top three.

Students have the choice to complete advanced academic pathways, including a pre-university International Baccalaureate Diploma, International Baccalaureate Career Certificate or an International Skills Diploma. The school also offers a number of languages for students to learn, including: Italian, French, and Spanish.

The school day at Hardaway runs from 8:10 am to 3:25 pm, Monday through Friday. Lunch is divided into five segments of twenty-five minutes each. Hardaway has two long "one-way" hallways. All of the shorter hallways can be traveled in either direction .

Athletics
The Lady Hawks basketball team is currently ranked first in the state. The HHS wrestling team finished 133–0 in the 5A division, which gave them the titles for area, city, and state champions.

The Ledger Enquirer named Hardaway's Athletic Director the Bi-City Coach of the Year..

School accolades

2019 accolades 
Student wins Georgia Youth Leadership Award.

Georgia Academic Decathlon, 2019 Highest Individual Scores:

 Gold, Honor category, for Brady Hampel.
 Silver, Varsity category, for Timothy Cockcroft.
 Silver, Scholastic category, for David Dzwik

2017 accolades 

 Academic Decathlon team achieved third place overall in state competition and second place in Division I.
 Student named Exchange Club's Youth of the Year.

2016 accolades 

 First place US History, third place Student Growth Awards for Algebra.
 The four-year graduation rate was 90.3%.
 Sixteen students earned the International Skills Diploma Seal (ISDS).
 Three students received the Gates Millennium Scholarship.

Notable alumni
 Josh Harbour, co-founder of Red Dress Boutique
 Wesly Mallard, former NFL player
 Kelcie McCray, NFL player
 Walter Palmore, NFL player
 Marcus Smith II, former NFL player and Children's author
 Robert Steele, former NFL player

References

External links
 

High schools in Columbus, Georgia
Public high schools in Georgia (U.S. state)
Educational institutions established in 1965
1965 establishments in Georgia (U.S. state)